Sioux Center is a city in Sioux County, Iowa. The population was 8,229 at the time of the 2020 census. Sioux Center is notable for its Dutch heritage, agribusiness, and as the location of Dordt University.

Geography
Sioux Center is located at  (43.076546, −96.173214).

It lies near the north-to-south ridge, or spine, of western Iowa. The eastern side of Sioux Center drains to the Floyd River. The western side drains to the Big Sioux River. This "divide" is profoundly unnoticeable. The area within a ten-mile (16 km) radius of Sioux Center has been divided into sections of one square mile each. The gravel and paved roads marking the sections do not swerve or contour for the slight hills or valleys.

Climate

Demographics

2010 census
As of the census of 2010, there were 7,048 people, 2,201 households, and 1,598 families residing in the city. The racial makeup of the city was 91.6% White, 0.4% African American, 0.3% Native American, 1.2% Asian, 5.4% from other races, and 1.0% from two or more races. Hispanic or Latino of any race were 13.1% of the population.

There were 2,201 households, of which 35.2% had children under the age of 18 living with them, 64.4% were married couples living together, 5.5% had a female householder with no husband present, 2.7% had a male householder with no wife present, and 27.4% were non-families. 23.9% of all households were made up of individuals, and 12.6% had someone living alone who was 65 years of age or older. The average household size was 2.70 and the average family size was 3.18.

The median age in the city was 27.7 years. 24.4% of residents were under the age of 18; 22.3% were between the ages of 18 and 24; 21.6% were from 25 to 44; 18.8% were from 45 to 64; and 13% were 65 years of age or older. The gender makeup of the city was 49.4% male and 50.6% female.

2000 census
As of the census of 2000, there were 6,002 people, 1,831 households, and 1,351 families residing in the city. The racial makeup of the city was 96.58% White, 0.15% African American, 0.10% Native American, 0.85% Asian, 0.03% Pacific Islander, 1.62% from other races, and 0.67% from two or more races. Hispanic or Latino of any race were 4.67% of the population, but this population continues to grow.

There were 1,831 households, out of which 33.9% had children under the age of 18 living with them, 68.0% were married couples living together, 4.8% had a female householder with no husband present, and 26.2% were non-families. 23.1% of all households were made up of individuals, and 12.4% had someone living alone who was 65 years of age or older. The average household size was 2.63 and the average family size was 3.10.

Age spread: 22.3% under the age of 18, 27.1% from 18 to 24, 20.7% from 25 to 44, 15.4% from 45 to 64, and 14.5% who were 65 years of age or older. The median age was 26 years. For every 100 females, there were 92.1 males. For every 100 females age 18 and over, there were 89.1 males.

The median income for a household in the city was $42,775, and the median income for a family was $51,039. Males had a median income of $35,821 versus $20,025 for females. The per capita income for the city was $16,912. About 4.9% of families and 7.1% of the population were below the poverty line, including 8.2% of those under age 18 and 5.8% of those age 65 or over.

In 2000, 66.66% of Sioux Center residents identified as being of Dutch heritage. This was the largest percentage of Dutch Americans of any place in the country.

Economy
Sioux Center commerce, like many smaller towns in northwest Iowa, is dominated by agribusiness. Farmland near Sioux Center sold for a record $20,000 per acre in December 2011. The quality of the farmland and its ability to produce high yields of corn and soybeans is the primary natural resource that propels the economy. Many of the larger employers in the area supply support materials to grain and animal production, process the results of grain and animal production, or provide services to the people involved in agricultural supply, production, and processing. Most of the tallest and the largest structures in town are grain storage facilities.

Other major local employers include the Interstates Companies, which specialize in the design and installation of electrical systems for industrial and commercial projects, and Pella, which manufactures windows and employs approximately 400 people in the local plant.

Sioux Center continues to have freight rail service. The BNSF Railway's main line runs parallel to U.S. Highway 75 through Sioux Center. There are several rail spurs and a BNSF equipment station. Grain is the main rail transported commodity.

Notable people
 Vern Den Herder, player on the undefeated Miami Dolphins NFL team of 1972
 Nancy Meendering Metcalf, American indoor volleyball player
 Delwin Vriend, whose civil rights case Vriend v. Alberta established sexual orientation as a protected human right in Canada
Dennis Muilenburg, former president, chairman, and CEO of Boeing

Attractions and events
In 2012, Sioux Center was the first stop of RAGBRAI XL (Register's Annual Great Bicycle Ride Across Iowa). Sioux Center has hosted RAGBRAI on 3 other occasions: 1990, 1996, and 2002.
The Sioux County Youth Fair is held every year for about one week in the middle of July. The fair is mainly focused on agriculture, but there are also live events like musical performances and various activities for kids.

Early in June the city hosts "Summer Celebration" which features a car show and cruise night as well as other miscellaneous events. The "pork feeders" host an annual picnic in the central park. The "Siouxperman Triathlon," inaugurated in 2007, is held annually in early May and the "Harvest Half Marathon & 10K" is held annually in early October.

Sioux Center has several entertainment options. The All Seasons Center, which includes the Siouxnami Waterpark and indoor aquatic center, an ice skating arena, and spaces available for rent, is a mixed-use facility open to local residents and students of Dordt University. The university's Campus Center has a bowling alley and recreation center.

Religion
Sioux Center's strongly Dutch heritage is also largely a Reformed (Calvinistic) Protestant heritage. Sioux Center has five Christian Reformed churches, four Reformed Church in America churches, one United Reformed church, and one Netherlands Reformed Church. There is also an Evangelical Free Church, one Lutheran Congregations in Mission for Christ church, and one ELCA church. A Roman Catholic parish is part of a cluster of two other parishes in nearby towns, all served by a single priest within the Diocese of Sioux City. Sioux Center is also home to Amistad Christiana, which is a Spanish-speaking congregation affiliated with the CRC and the RCA.

Culture
Sioux Center is home to the Northwest Iowa Symphony Orchestra. Their concert hall is the Dordt University chapel known as the B.J. Haan Auditorium. The orchestra is composed mostly of volunteers from the NW corner of Iowa. Some of the principals are paid positions. The orchestra also offers scholarships and opportunities for developing musicians from the local schools and colleges. Dr. Henry Duitman directed the orchestra for the past 22 years and was recently hired as an Assistant Professor by Grand Valley State University in Allendale Charter Township, Michigan, leaving a conductor vacancy for the orchestra. In April 2011, it was announced that Christopher Stanichar, the Director of Orchestral Activities at Augustana University in Sioux Falls, South Dakota, would be taking the director's position for the orchestra.

Education

Schools

Sioux Center is the home of Dordt University, formerly known as Dordt College. Dordt's 1,500 students are drawn from the local area, Christian Reformed and Reformed communities across the United States and Canada, and other locations throughout the United States and worldwide. Dordt's engineering, education, and agriculture programs are especially popular with students.

The Sioux Center Community School district educates 1,055 students as of February 2, 2011. The school is one of the few non-consolidated schools in northwest Iowa. The kindergarten through 4th grade Kinsey Elementary School posted an all-time high enrollment of 450 in the fall of 2011. 298 students are enrolled at the middle school, and 299 are at the high school. The elementary building and the middle school completed additional construction projects in 2010.

Sioux Center Christian School educates approximately 508 students grades pre-K through 8th. Most students who graduate from Sioux Center Christian continue to either Western Christian High School in Hull, Iowa or Unity Christian High School in Orange City, Iowa, although some go to the Sioux Center High School for their high school education.

The sports teams of Dordt University and Sioux Center Community Schools enjoy a friendly, yet heated, rivalry with the teams of Orange City. Dordt University and Northwestern College compete in a number of sports, including soccer, volleyball and basketball. Dordt University recently started a football program, fielding a Junior Varsity team in the fall of 2007 and a Varsity team in 2008. MOC-Floyd Valley Community School competes spiritedly with Sioux Center Community School in many school activities. Sioux Center is a large division 2A school.

Library
The Sioux Center Public Library began in 1927. The library's location changed many times over the years due to expanding demand and resource materials. In 1967, the library opened in a new location one block northeast of the current Centre Mall. On July 23, 2003, a fire destroyed nearly the entire library. About $600,000 of materials were lost, though some materials were restored and saved.
The library was moved to the community center while plans were drawn up for construction of a new location. Completed in September 2008, the Sioux Center Library's new location opened up the door to many services - private meeting rooms, an art gallery, and many computers available for public use.

Organizations

Boy Scouts of America
Scouting began in Sioux Center back in 1923. The Sioux Center troop was charted as Troop 1 with Sioux City Area Council. After a number of years, Troop 1 was discontinued until 1935. Under the same council, Troop 94 was chartered by the American Legion Post #199. The Troop has continued since 1935. In 1943, the Sioux City Area Council transferred the troop to the Prairie Gold Area Council located in Fort Dodge, Iowa. At that time, Troop 94 was redesignated as Troop 211. The troop has had over 75 Scouts reach the rank of Eagle Scout in its history.

Sioux Center Wreaths Across America
The tradition of laying wreaths to honor veterans during the holiday season began in 1992, when Morrill Worcester of Worcester Wreath Company (Harrington, Maine) was stuck with a number of extra wreaths at the close of the holiday season. Remembering a boyhood trip to Arlington National Cemetery, he donated 5,000 wreaths to be placed at the headstones of an older section of the cemetery. Worcester's action grew into a national movement. In 2006, Wreaths Across America was formed as a non-profit. Every year on a Saturday in December, more than 1,000 locations participate by laying wreaths out of remembrance and respect for America's servicemen and women. Each wreath is sponsored by individuals, organizations, or businesses. Each sponsorship lays one wreath in Memory Gardens. Currently, Aaron Van Beek serves as director of the Sioux Center program.

References

https://web.archive.org/web/20111208010423/http://quickfacts.census.gov/qfd/states/19/1973290.html

External links

 https://web.archive.org/web/20061102000354/http://www.iowa.gov/educate/
 http://www.siouxcenterchamber.com
 http://www.siouxcenter.org
 https://web.archive.org/web/20120119015247/http://sioux-center.k12.ia.us/
 http://www.siouxcenterchristian.com
 http://www.dordt.edu
 http://www.siouxcenterscouts.org 
 http://www.siouxcenterwaa.org

 
Cities in Iowa
Dutch-American culture in Iowa
Cities in Sioux County, Iowa